Antecrurisa apicalis is a species of beetle in the family Cerambycidae, the only species in the genus Antecrurisa.

References

Acanthocinini